This is a list of tambon (sub-districts) in Thailand, beginning with the letters N and O. This information is liable to change due to border changes or re-allocation of Tambons. Missing Tambon numbers show where the number is either not used or the Tambon has been transferred to a different Amphoe.

 N3